Juan José Giambiagi (18 June 1924 – 8 January 1996) was an Argentinian physicist and co-discoverer of the dimensional regularization.

References
Biography of Juan José Giambiagi

Recipients of the National Order of Scientific Merit (Brazil)
1924 births
1996 deaths